The Naked Kiss is a 1964 American neo-noir  melodrama film, written and directed by Samuel Fuller and starring Constance Towers, Anthony Eisley, Michael Dante, and Virginia Grey. The film follows a former prostitute who attempts to assimilate in suburbia after fleeing her pimp, but finds that the small town to which she has relocated is not as picturesque as she had believed. It was Fuller's second film for Allied Artists after his 1963 film Shock Corridor.

Plot
Kelly is a prostitute who arrives by bus in the small town of Grantville, just one more burg in a long string of quick stops on the run after being chased out of the big city by her former pimp. She engages in a quick tryst with local police captain Griff, who then tells her to stay out of his town and refers her to a cat-house just across the state line.

Instead, she decides to give up her illicit lifestyle, becoming a nurse at a hospital for disabled children. Griff doesn't trust reformed prostitutes, however, and continues trying to run her out of town.

Kelly falls in love with J.L. Grant, the wealthy scion of the town's founding family, an urbane sophisticate, and Griff's best friend. After a dream-like courtship where even Kelly's admission of her past can't deter Grant, the two decide to marry. It is only after Kelly is able to finally convince Griff that she truly loves Grant and has given up prostitution for good that he agrees to be their best man.

Shortly before the wedding, Kelly arrives at Grant's mansion, only to find him on the verge of molesting a small girl. As he grinningly tries to persuade her to marry him, arguing that she too is a deviant, the only one who can understand him, and that he loves her, Kelly kills him by striking him in the head with a phone receiver. Jailed, and under heavy interrogation from Griff, she must convince him and the town that she is telling the truth about Grant's death.

Kelly tries to exonerate herself, but the little girl cannot be located, and one disappointment follows another, as enemies old and new parade through the jailhouse to defame her. In despair, she is finally able to identify Grant's victim and prove her innocence. She is released, but, now notorious, has to leave town, boarding a bus to her next destination.

Cast
 Constance Towers as Kelly
 Anthony Eisley as Capt. Griff
 Michael Dante as J.L. Grant
 Virginia Grey as Candy
 Patsy Kelly as Mac, Head Nurse
 Marie Devereux as Buff
 Karen Conrad as Dusty
 Linda Francis as Rembrandt
 Bill Sampson as Jerry
 Jean-Michel Michenaud as Kip
 George Spell as Tim
 Christopher Barry as Peanuts
 Patty Robinson as Angel Face
 Edy Williams as Hatrack 
 Betty Bronson as Miss Josephine, the Seamstress
 Neyle Morrow as Officer Sam

Production

Fuller's prior film, Shock Corridor (1963), also starring Towers, is on the marquee of the theater near the bus station where Kelly arrives in town. Kelly is also reading Fuller's pulp novel The Dark Page when she meets Griff.

Reception

Critical response
The staff at Variety magazine gave the film and acting a positive contemporary review, writing, "Good Samuel Fuller programmer about a prostie trying the straight route, The Naked Kiss is primarily a vehicle for Constance Towers. Hooker angles and sex perversion plot windup are handled with care, alternating with handicapped children 'good works' theme...Towers' overall effect is good, director Fuller overcoming his routine script in displaying blonde looker's acting range."

Eugene Archer, writing in The New York Times in 1964, wrote that The Naked Kiss "has style to burn" and shows that Fuller is "one of the liveliest, most visual-minded and cinematically knowledgeable filmmakers now working in the low-budget Hollywood grist mill", but denounced the plot as "patently absurd" and "sensational nonsense", judging the whole as a "wild little movie". 

Critic Jerry Renshaw liked the film and wrote in 1998, "The Naked Kiss finds Sam Fuller's tabloid sensibilities boiling to the surface, as it dwells on the uncomfortable and taboo subjects of deviancy, prostitution, and small-town sanctimony. In typical Fuller style, it's a hard look at a nightmarish world, lurid and absorbing enough to demand that the viewer watch. It's part melodrama, part sensationalism, and part surreal, but above all it's absolutely, positively 100% Sam Fuller, with all the nuance and subtlety of a swift kick in the butt."

Home media
A digitally restored version of the film was released on DVD and Blu-ray by The Criterion Collection. The release includes new video interview with star Constance Towers by film historian and filmmaker Charles Dennis, excerpts from a 1983 episode of The South Bank Show dedicated to Samuel Fuller, an interview with Fuller from a 1967 episode of the French television series Cinéastes de notre temps, and an interview with Fuller from a 1987 episode of the French television series Cinéma cinémas. There is also a booklet featuring an essay by critic and poet Robert Polito and excerpts from Fuller's autobiography, A Third Face: My Tale of Writing, Fighting, and Filmmaking.

See also
List of American films of 1964

References

External links
 
 
 
 
 The Naked Kiss at DVD Beaver (includes images)
The Naked Kiss an essay by Michael Dare at the Criterion Collection 
The Naked Kiss: Fractured Fairy Tales an essay by Robert Polito at the Criterion Collection 
 

1964 films
1964 crime drama films
Allied Artists films
American crime drama films
American black-and-white films
1960s English-language films
Films about prostitution in the United States
Films directed by Samuel Fuller
Films shot in Los Angeles
Films about child sexual abuse
American neo-noir films
Films scored by Paul Dunlap
1960s American films